OAG or Oag may refer to:

Air travel
Orange Airport (IATA code), New South Wales, Australia
OAG (company), also known as Official Airline Guide, a UK-based air travel intelligence company

Offices
Office of the Auditor General (disambiguation)
Office of the Advocate General for Scotland
Ohio Attorney General, United States

Other uses
OAG (band), a Malaysian rock band
Overly Attached Girlfriend, a 2012 internet meme
Optical axis gratings
Ottawa Art Gallery, Canada
Jamie Oag (born 1966), Scottish businessman
Organizational-activity game, for facilitating organisational change